Jane Bowles (born Jane Sydney Auer;  February 22, 1917 – May 4, 1973) was an American writer and playwright.

Early life
Born into a Jewish family in New York City on February 22, 1917, to Sydney Auer (father) and Claire Stajer (mother), Jane Bowles spent her childhood in Woodmere, New York, on Long Island. She had had a bad knee from birth, which was later broken from falling off a horse when she was a teenager. After knee surgery, she developed tuberculous arthritis, and her mother took her to Switzerland for treatment, where she attended boarding school. She also attended Julia Richmond High School in New York and Stoneleigh School for Girls in Greenfield, Massachusetts.

At this point in her life, she developed a passion for literature coupled with insecurities. She developed phobias of dogs, sharks, mountains, jungles, and elevators as well as fears of being burned alive. During the mid-1930s she returned to New York, where she gravitated to the intellectual bohemia of Greenwich Village.

She married composer and writer Paul Bowles in 1938. The location of the honeymoon inspired the setting for her novel Two Serious Ladies.

Personal life
Bowles had a rich love life. In 1937, she and Paul Bowles were introduced to each other by Erika Mann and in the following year (1938), they were married and went on honeymoon in Central America. She visited lesbian bars while they traveled together in Paris. The marriage was a sexual marriage for about a year and a half. After the initial year, Jane and Paul were platonic companions. They both were bisexual, and mainly preferred to have sex outside of their marriage.

After this, Jane and Paul went to Mexico where Jane later met Helvetia Perkins, who became her lover.

Career
In 1943, her novel Two Serious Ladies was published. The Bowleses lived in New York until 1947 when Paul moved to Tangier, Morocco; Jane followed him in 1948. While in Morocco, Jane had an intense and complicated relationship with a Moroccan woman named Cherifa. She also had a close relationship with torch singer Libby Holman who was attracted to both Jane and Paul, but Paul did not reciprocate.

Jane Bowles wrote the play In the Summer House, performed on Broadway in 1953 to mixed reviews. Tennessee Williams, Truman Capote, and John Ashbery all highly praised her work.

In the Summer House
In the Summer House was her only full-length play. It was first performed in 1951 in the Hedgerow Theater in Moylan, Pennsylvania. The play opened on Broadway at the Playhouse Theatre on December 29, 1953, with music by Paul Bowles, where it ran for two months to mixed reviews and low attendance. Around 1963, the play was revived. The play was revived again in 1993 at the Vivian Beaumont Theater with incidental music by Philip Glass. This revival received nominations for the 1994 Drama Desk Awards for outstanding director of a play, set design, and supporting actress (JoAnne Akalaitis, George Tsypin, and Frances Conroy, respectively).

The overarching plot is the comparison of an overbearing mother and gentle daughter and a gentle mother and an overbearing daughter. The plot is driven by character interaction and not action. It begins with a monolog by Ms. Gertude Eastman Cuevas, an isolated widow from Southern California who marries a rich Mexican (with a singing and dancing comrade), who is oppressive towards her daughter. The other widow is Ms. Constable and her challenging daughter. The daughters are both unstable.

Miss Cuevas has a suitor which makes the mother feel like she needs to be more overbearing. The first act closes on Ms. Cuevas and her new husband reading newspaper silently.

The second act occurs in a restaurant named The Lobster Bowl and uses intensive food imagery. Bowles's complex relationship with her mother could have been an inspiration for the plot.

Death
Bowles, who was an alcoholic, suffered a stroke in 1957 at age 40. The stroke affected her sight and mental capacity, but she pushed through her health problems and continued to write. Her health continued to decline despite various treatments in England and the United States until she had to be admitted to a clinic in Málaga, Spain, where she died in 1973, at age 56.

Legacy
In Paul Bowles's semi-autobiographical novel The Sheltering Sky, the characters Port and Kit Moresby were based on him and his wife. Debra Winger played Kit in the film adaptation of the novel.

Footnotes

References

External links

Archives 

 Jane Auer Bowles Papers, Paul Bowles Papers, and the Millicent Dillon Papers at the Harry Ransom Center
 Materials about Jane Bowles in the Paul Bowles papers at the University of Delaware
 Jane Bowles Papers at the University of Virginia Library

Other links 
Biography at the official Paul Bowles website

Sprague, Claire. "Jane Bowles", Jewish Women: A Comprehensive Historical Encyclopedia

1917 births
1973 deaths
20th-century American novelists
20th-century American dramatists and playwrights
20th-century American women writers
Bisexual women
LGBT Jews
People from Greenwich Village
People from Málaga
People from Woodmere, New York
People from Staten Island
People from Tangier
Jewish American dramatists and playwrights
Beat Generation writers
American women dramatists and playwrights
American women novelists
American LGBT dramatists and playwrights
American LGBT novelists
LGBT people from New York (state)
American expatriates in Mexico
Novelists from New York (state)
American expatriates in Morocco
20th-century American Jews
20th-century American LGBT people
American bisexual writers